Tom Lee Osborn is a Kenyan mental health activist and environmentalist. He is best known for providing mental health care solutions to teens across Kenya. Osborn was the echoing Green Fellow and was named on Forbes as a 30 under 30 social entrepreneurs in 2015.

Life & education

Osborn was born and raised in Awendo,Migori County, Kenya. He attended Alliance High School. He graduated from Harvard College with a Bachelor’s in Psychology.

Career
Osborn started his first initiative at 18 with his high school friends Ian Oluoch and Brian Kiprotich. After graduating high school, he founded "GreenChar" intending to transform the Kenyan cooking environment, 
He realized the harmful effects of cooking with charcoal on his mother’s health and the environment. He made charcoal briquettes from recycled sugarcane waste as an alternative of traditional charcoal. His project planned to reduce the effects of deforestation and improve the health of women and children.

Osborn is associated with institutions like General Electric, MIT, and Echoing Green.

Around the end of his first year at Harvard, his brother, who had served in peacekeeping efforts in Ethiopia and Somalia, was experiencing Mental Health difficulties, he reached out to Professor John Weisz’s Laboratory for Youth Mental Health, seeking expert help for building evidence-based mental health interventions. 
He founded Shamiri Institute at Harvard to address youth mental health in Kenya and across Africa. 

On November 4, 2022, he revived over Ksh17.8 million Fund in Innovation for Development (FID).

Selected Publications

Journal Articles

Awards 
 Anzisha Prize 2014
 Forbes 30 under 30
 Echoing Green Fellow 2014

References

Living people
Year of birth missing (living people)
Kenyan activists
Kenyan environmentalists
Kenyan health activists
People from Migori County
Harvard University alumni